Clam Lake is a lake located in Waterford Township, Michigan. It lies north of Highland Rd. (M-59), south of Hatchery Rd, west of Crescent Lake Rd. and east of Airport Rd.

The 21-acre lake is spring fed.

Fish
Clam Lake fish include Smallmouth Bass, Crappie and Bluegill.

References

Lakes of Oakland County, Michigan
Lakes of Michigan
Lakes of Waterford Township, Michigan